The Al Jazeera Balkans Documentary Film Festival - AJB DOC is an annual international documentary film festival that is based in Sarajevo, Bosnia and Herzegovina. Its first edition was held from 21–25 September 2018. The festival was established by Al Jazeera Balkans in cooperation with the Al Jazeera Media Network and the Doha-based Al Jazeera Media Institute. Al Jazeera Balkans is currently the biggest buyer of television format documentaries in the Former Yugoslavia and annually acquires rights for most of the regional documentary films that are screened during the Sarajevo Film Festival. AJB DOC directly lent its concept from the Aljazeera International Documentary Film Festival, which was founded in 2005 by Jordanian film director and writer, Abbas Arnaout.

History
On 13 February 2018 Al Jazeera Balkans confirmed the establishment of the AJB DOC Festival which will be held from 21–25 September 2018. Sarajevo was chosen as the venue because it already hosts the premier and largest film festival in Southeast Europe, the Sarajevo Film Festival.

On 21 September 2018 the first edition of the AJB DOC Festival was opened in Cinema City Sarajevo with the screening of Søren Steen Jespersen's documentary, Lost Warrior. The 2018 edition's jury consisted of American actress, Karen Hayes, British media consultant, Ingrid Falk, Palestinian-Jordanian filmmaker and journalist, Montaser Marai, Croatian sociologist, Robert Tomić Zuber and Bosnian producer, Zoran Galić.

Format
The official objective of the AJB DOC Festival, outlined by the Al Jazeera Media Network, is to "promote authors and documentaries addressing social phenomena with a focus on universal human values such as courage, truth, justice, tolerance and cosmopolitism." The festival's official competition selection for the 2018 edition consisted of 15 international documentaries adapted for TV broadcasting. The non-competition selection, known as Last Minute Cinema, consisted of five acclaimed international documentaries. All selected films are considered for acquisition by Al Jazeera Balkans and its sister channel, Al Jazeera English, and will subsequently be screened on television. The selections will be finalized in June.

The AJB DOC Festival, in cooperation with the Al Jazeera Media Network, holds a multi-day documentary workshop for authors, independent productions and film students from the Former Yugoslavia. In addition to film screenings, the first edition of AJB DOC Festival hosted post-screening Q&A sessions, social events, exhibitions and other content with the desire to create an atmosphere of artistic exchange and professional networking.

Venues
Cinema City Sarajevo

References

External links
 Official website

Al Jazeera
Film festivals established in 2018
September events
Tourist attractions in Sarajevo
Annual events in Bosnia and Herzegovina
Documentary film festivals in Bosnia and Herzegovina
Film festivals in Sarajevo